24ore.tv was a financial-news TV channel in Italian founded by Il Sole 24 Ore in 2001.

It was also launched on web TV, on Hotbird and on digital television in Italy on Mediaset multiplex.

It  broadcast financial news bulletins, talk shows and documentaries. During the night, it was shown on Radio 24.

It was closed in 2007 due to low-revenue and technical problems.

Business-related television channels
Defunct television channels in Italy
Italian-language television stations
Television channels and stations established in 2001
Television channels and stations disestablished in 2007
Mass media in Milan
24-hour television news channels in Italy
2001 establishments in Italy
2007 disestablishments in Italy